The 39 episodes of the animated series The Mysterious Cities of Gold were co-produced between DiC Entertainment and Studio Pierrot. The series premiere episode was broadcast in Japan by NHK on 1 May 1982, and it entirely ran for 39 episodes until its conclusion on 5 February 1983. The plot of the episodes follows a young Spanish boy named Esteban who joins a voyage to the New World in search of the lost Seven Cities of Gold and his father.

The series aired in the English dubbed format in the United States, premiering on Nickelodeon on 30 June 1986 and running through 29 June 1990. English dubbed episodes also aired in the United Kingdom on Children's BBC, and in Australia, on the public broadcaster ABC in 1986. The series was translated and aired in France on Antenne 2. The episodes have been released to both VHS and DVD in France, Belgium, Japan, Canada (in French) and Germany. In 2007, Fabulous Films acquired the license to release the series in Region 2 (Europe), Region 1, and Region 4. All 39 unedited episodes of the series were released in the United Kingdom on 23 June 2008 as a six DVD set with the picture and sound restored. The DVD was released in Australia in August 2008. It was released in North America on 7 April 2009.  In 2013 the original series was released in on Blu-ray in France.


Episode list

See also
 List of The Mysterious Cities of Gold characters

Notes

References

Mysterious Cities of Gold
Episodes